Homadaula montana is a moth in the family Galacticidae. It was described by Wolfram Mey in 2007. It is found in Yemen.

References

Moths described in 2007
Galacticidae